The insulin-like growth factor receptors (IGFRs) include the following two receptors:

 Insulin-like growth factor 1 receptor (IGF-1R)
 Insulin-like growth factor 2 receptor (IGF-2R)

See also
 Insulin-like growth factor
 Insulin-like growth factor 1
 Insulin-like growth factor 2
 Insulin-like growth factor-binding protein

References

G protein-coupled receptors